Diary of a Tired Black Man is a 2008 independent film that combines elements of a comedy-drama with elements of a documentary film. It is the debut film of writer/director Tim Alexander.

Plot
Diary of a Tired Black Man is a narrative dramatic-comedy that is also combined with documentary footage shot across the country. The scripted narrative portion centers around James (Jimmy Jean-Louis) and his wife Tonya (Paula Lema), and James' struggle to deal with his wife's outbursts of anger and antagonistic behavior.

The documentary portion of the film follows Tim Alexander as he goes around getting feedback, opinions and commentary from real-life African-American men and women in various cities across the United States about the challenges they deal with in their marriages and dating relationships.

Cast
 Jimmy Jean-Louis as James
 Paula Lema as Tonya
 Natasha M. Dixon as Bridgette
 Kimmarie Johnson as Sexy Woman At Club (credited as Kim Marie Johnson)
 Tim Alexander as himself and the narrator

References

External links 
 

Reviews
 "Black Entertainment USA"
 "DVD Talk Review"
 "Chud"
 "Kam Williams Review"
 AB Goes To The Movies : The Diary Of A Tired Black Man

2008 films
2000s English-language films
African-American gender relations in popular culture
2008 comedy-drama films
African-American comedy-drama films
2008 directorial debut films
2000s American films